Kurt E. Olson (born March 24, 1948) is a Republican former member of the Alaska House of Representatives, representing the 30th District from 2005 until 2017. He is currently serving as Chair of the Labor & Commerce Committee, Vice Chair of the Rules Committee, a member of the Resources Committee, and Legislative Budget & Audit Committee. He also serves on the Administration, Natural Resources, and Labor & Workforce Finance Subcommittees, for the 29th Legislature. Representative Olson also served in the United States Air Force from 1967 to 1971.

Personal life
Representative Olson has a wife: Barbara, two children: Madelyn and Valerie, a granddaughter: Isabella. Representative Olson graduated from Cupertino High School in 1966, and received a Bachelor of Arts from California State University in 1977.

References

External links
 Alaska State House Majority Site 
 Alaska State Legislature Biography
 Project Vote Smart profile
 Kurt Olson at 100 Years of Alaska's Legislature

1948 births
21st-century American politicians
Living people
Republican Party members of the Alaska House of Representatives
People from Soldotna, Alaska
Syracuse University alumni
United States Air Force officers